Julio Peredejordi (22 February 1906 – October 1973) was a Spanish swimmer. He competed in the men's 4 × 200 metre freestyle relay event at the 1924 Summer Olympics.

References

External links
 

1906 births
1973 deaths
Olympic swimmers of Spain
Swimmers at the 1924 Summer Olympics
Place of birth missing
Spanish male freestyle swimmers